HMS Venerable was a 74-gun third-rate ship of the line of the Royal Navy, launched on 12 April 1808 at Northfleet.

Career
On 13 December 1810 Venerable was in company with the hired armed cutter  and several other vessels at the capture of Goede Trouw.

On 12 March 1812, as the merchant ship  was returning from Lima and Cadiz, the French privateer Amelia captured her. However,  recaptured Ramoncita.

On 31 December 1813, she captured the French letter of marque brig Jason which became . Jason, of 264 tons (bm), was pierced for 22 guns but carried 14, 12 of which she had thrown overboard when Venerable chased her. She had left Bordeaux five days earlier and was sailing for New York with a cargo of silks, wines, and other articles of merchandise. There were 64 people on board, ten of whom were passengers. She was on her maiden voyage, copper-bottomed, and sailed so well, Captain Worth took her under protection, intending to go to Barbados.

Venerable joined her and after a chase that left Cyane far behind, captured Alcmène, though not without a fight. Venerable lost two men dead and four wounded, while the French lost 32 dead and 50 wounded. Alcmène had a complement of 319 men under the command of Captain Ducrest de Villeneuve, who was wounded when he brought her alongside Venerable and attempted a boarding.

Jason and Cyane tracked Iphigénie and initially fired on her but broke off the engagement because they were outgunned. Cyane continued the chase for over three days until Venerable was able to rejoin the fight after having sailed 153 miles in the direction she believed that Iphigénie had taken. On 20 January 1814, after a 19-hour chase, or what amounted in all to a four-day chase Iphigénie, Venerable captured the quarry, having again left Cyane behind. In the chase, Iphigénie cast off her anchors and threw her boats overboard in order to try to gain speed. She had a complement of 325 men, under the command of Captain Émeric. She apparently did not resist after Venerable came up.  Before meeting up with the British ships, the two French vessels had taken some eight prizes. The action resulted in the award in 1847, to any surviving claimants, of the Naval General Service Medal with clasp "Venerable 16 Jany. 1814".

Venerable was able to locate Iphigénie because Commander Ducrest de Villeneuve of Alcmène was so angry at Captain Émeric, who was the senior French commander, for not having come alongside Venerable on the other side also to board, that he essentially revealed the rendezvous instructions to Durham. When some prisoners from Iphigénies crew were brought on Venerable, crew from Alcmène too were enraged. Durham had to station Royal Marines between them, with fixed bayonets, to prevent fighting from breaking out.

Fate

Venerable was placed on harbour service in 1825, and was broken up in 1838.

Notes

References
Citations

Bibliography

 James, William & Frederick Chamier (1837) The naval history of Great Britain : from the declaration of war by France in 1793 to the accession of George IV. (London: R. Bentley).
 Lavery, Brian (2003) The Ship of the Line - Volume 1: The development of the battlefleet 1650-1850. Conway Maritime Press. .
 Long, William H. (1895) Medals of the British navy and how they were won: with a list of those officers, who for their gallant conduct were granted honorary swords and plate by the Committee of the Patriotic Fund. (London: Norie & Wilson).

External links
 

Ships of the line of the Royal Navy
Repulse-class ships of the line
1808 ships